The following are basketball events that are expected to take place in 2022 throughout the world.
Tournaments include international (FIBA), professional (club), and amateur and collegiate levels.

International tournaments

National senior team tournaments

3X3 championships

Men

Women

Other international championships

FIBA youth championships

Professional club seasons

FIBA Intercontinental Cup

Continental seasons

Men

Women

Regional seasons

Men

Women

Domestic league seasons

Men

Europe

Asia

Americas

African

Oceania

Other Country

Women

Europe

Asia

Americas

African

Oceania

Other Country

College seasons

Men's

Women's

Deaths 
 January 15 — Joe B. Hall, 93, American college coach (Kentucky, Regis, Central Missouri). National championship in 1978.
 January 18 — Lorenzo Alocén, 84, Spanish Olympic player (1968).
 January 18 — Lusia Harris, 66, American Hall of Fame college (Delta State) and professional (Houston Angels) player, Olympic silver medalist (1976).
 January 19 — Leland Byrd, 94, All-American player (West Virginia) and college coach (Glenville State).
 January 21 — James Forbes, 69, American Olympic silver medalist (1972).
 January 21 — Axel Nikulásson, 59, Icelandic player (Keflavík, Grindavík, KR) and coach.
 January 26 — Juan Báez, 86, Puerto Rican Olympic player (1960, 1964).
 February 1 — Stanisław Olejniczak, 83, Polish Olympic player (1964).
 February 2 — Bill Fitch, 89, American Hall of Fame NBA (Cleveland Cavaliers, Boston Celtics, Houston Rockets, New Jersey Nets, Los Angeles Clippers) and college (North Dakota, Bowling Green, Minnesota)  coach.
 February 8 — Bill Lienhard, 92, American college player (Kansas) and Olympic gold medalist (1952). NCAA champion (1952).
 February 8 — Jackie Robinson, 94, American Olympic gold medalist (1948).
 February 14 — Kenny Ejim, 27, Canadian player (Zornotza, Saskatchewan Rattlers, Hamilton Honey Badgers).
 February 16 — Andrey Lopatov, 64, Russian Olympic bronze medalist (1980).
 February 25 — Dick Versace, 81, American college (Bradley) and NBA (Indiana Pacers) coach, executive (Memphis Grizzlies).
 March 3 — Rich Yonakor, 63, American NBA player (San Antonio Spurs).
 March 16 — Dick Knostman, 90, American NBA player (Syracuse Nationals) and college All-American (Kansas State).
 March 18 — Tom Barrise, 68, American NBA coach (New Jersey Nets).
 March 18 — Bob Daniels, 86, American college coach (Kentucky Wesleyan).
 March 20 — Tom Young, 89, American college coach (Rutgers, Catholic University, Old Dominion).
 March 22 — Elnardo Webster, 74, American ABA player (New York Nets, Memphis Pros).
 March 24 — Kenny McFadden, 61, New Zealand player and coach (Wellington Saints).
 March 26 — Joe Williams, 88, American college coach (Florida State, Furman, Jacksonville).
 March 30 — Urbano Zea, 80, Mexican Olympic player (1960).
 April 3 — Gene Shue, 90, American NBA player (Philadelphia Warriors, New York Knicks, Detroit Pistons, Baltimore Bullets) and coach (Washington Bullets, Philadelphia 76ers, San Diego Clippers).
 April 4 — Petar Skansi, 78, Croatian player (Jugoplastika, Yugoslavia national team) and coach (Benetton Treviso), Olympic silver medalist (1968).
 April 5 — Lee Rose, 85, American college coach (UNC Charlotte, Purdue, South Florida).
 April 6 — Abraham Sie, 22, Ivorian player (ABC Fighters, DUC Dakar, national team).
 April 9 — Inga Freidenfelds, 86, Australian Olympic player (1956).
 April 10 — John Drew, 67, American NBA player (Atlanta Hawks, Utah Jazz).
 April 11 — Wayne Cooper, 65, American NBA player (Golden State Warriors, Utah Jazz, Dallas Mavericks, Portland Trail Blazers, Denver Nuggets).
 April 16 — Mariano Ortiz, 77, Puerto Rican Olympic player (1968, 1972, 1976).
 April 19 — Freeman Williams, 65, American NBA player (San Diego Clippers, Atlanta Hawks, Utah Jazz, Washington Bullets).
 April 25 — Mike Preaseau, 86, American college player and NCAA champion (San Francisco).
 April 28 — Zoran Sretenović, 57, Serbian player (Crvena zvezda, Jugoplastika) and coach (Železničar Inđija), European champion (1991, 1995).
 May 2 — Nield Gordon, 91, American college coach (Winthrop).
 May 9 — Tadeusz Grygiel, 68, Polish player (Śląsk Wrocław).
 May 9 — Adreian Payne, 31, American NBA player (Atlanta Hawks, Minnesota Timberwolves, Orlando Magic).
 May 10 — Walter Hirsch, 92, American college player (Kentucky).
 May 10 — Bob Lanier, 73, American Hall of Fame NBA player (Detroit Pistons, Milwaukee Bucks) and coach (Golden State Warriors).
 May 11 — Claude Peter, 74, French player (Le Mans Sarthe Basket, national team).
 May 12 — Larry Holley, 76, American college coach (William Jewell, Central Methodist, Northwest Missouri State).
 May 16 — Algis Ignatavicius, 89, Australian Olympic player (1956).
 May 17 — Ademola Okulaja, 46, Nigerian-German player (Alba Berlin, FC Barcelona, Brose Baskets).
 May 18 — Sam Smith, 79, American ABA player (Minnesota Muskies, Kentucky Colonels, Utah Stars).
 May 21 — Jiří Zídek Sr., 78, Czech Olympic player (1972) and coach.
 May 27 — Don Goldstein, 84, American college player (Louisville).
 June 4 — Nate Miller, 34, American player (Ironi Nahariya, Ironi Ramat Gan, Incheon ET Land Elephants).
 June 6 — Yves-Marie Vérove, 72, French player (AS Berck, Caen, Étendard de Brest) and coach.
 June 8 — George Thompson, 74, American ABA (Pittsburgh Pipers, Memphis Tams) and NBA (Milwaukee Bucks) player.
 June 16 — Mike Pratt, 73, American ABA player (Kentucky Colonels), college coach (UNC Charlotte) and announcer (Kentucky).
 June 18 — Lennie Rosenbluth, 89, American NBA player (Philadelphia Warriors) and college All-American (North Carolina). NCAA champion (1957).
 June 20 — Caleb Swanigan, 25, American NBA player (Portland Trail Blazers, Sacramento Kings) and college All-American (Purdue).
 June 28 — Mike Schuler, 81, American NBA coach (Portland Trail Blazers, Los Angeles Clippers).
 July 1 — Joe Hatton, 74, Puerto Rican Olympic player (1968, 1972).
 July 4 — Miguel González, 83, Spanish Olympic player (1960).
 July 7 — Pedro Ferrándiz, 93, Spanish Hall of Fame coach (Real Madrid, national team).
 July 8 — Hugh Evans, 81, American Hall of Fame NBA referee.
 July 9 — Bernard Toone, 65, American NBA player (Philadelphia 76ers).
 July 10 — Juan Roca Brunet, 71, Cuban Olympic bronze medalist (1972).
 July 21 — Johnny Egan, 83, American NBA player (Detroit Pistons, New York Knicks, Baltimore Bullets, Los Angeles Lakers, Cleveland Cavaliers, San Diego Rockets) and coach (Houston Rockets).
 July 28 — Franco Casalini, 70, Italian coach (Olimpia Milano).
 July 31 — Bill Russell, 88, American Hall of Fame NBA player (Boston Celtics) and coach (Boston Celtics, Seattle SuperSonics, Sacramento Kings), Olympic gold medalist (1956). 11-time NBA champion.
 August 1 — Carlos Blixen, 85, Uruguayan Olympic bronze medallist (1956).
 August 6 — Steve Courtin, 79, American NBA player (Philadelphia 76ers).
 August 6 — Gene Visscher, 81, American college coach (Weber State, Northern Arizona).
 August 12 — Togo Palazzi, 90, American NBA player (Boston Celtics, Syracuse Nationals) and college coach (Holy Cross).
 August 15 — Pete Carril, 92, American Hall of Fame college coach (Reading HS, Lehigh, Princeton).
 August 16 — Wayne Yates, 84, American NBA player (Los Angeles Lakers) and college coach (Memphis State).
 August 18 — István Liptay, 87, Hungarian Olympic player (1960).
 August 25 — Radovan Radović, 86, Serbian player (BSK, Kartizan) and coach, Olympian (1960).
 August 26 — Charlie Brown, 86, American college player (Seattle University).
 August 29 — Pat McGeer, 95, Canadian Olympic player (1948).
 September 4 — Saint-Ange Vebobe, 69, French player (JA Vichy, Antibes, national team).
 September 12 — Harry Booth, 81, American college coach (St Joseph's).
 September 22 — Greg Lee, 70, American ABA (San Diego Conquistadors) and NBA (Portland Trail Blazers) player.
 September 23 — Celso Scarpini, 77, Brazilian Olympic player (1968).
 September 28 — Julio Osorio, 82, Panamanian Olympic player (1968).
 October 3 — Ron Franz, 76, American ABA player (Oakland Oaks, New Orleans Buccaneers, The Floridians, Memphis Tams, Dallas Chaparrals).
 October 3 — Tiffany Jackson, 37, American WNBA player (New York Liberty, Tulsa Shock, Los Angeles Sparks) and coach.
 October 8 — Julian Hammond, 79, American ABA player (Denver Rockets).
 October 10 — Joe Roberts, 86, American NBA (Syracuse Nationals) and ABA (Kentucky Colonels) player and coach.
 October 12 — Lucious Jackson, 80, American NBA player (Philadelphia 76ers) and Olympic gold medalist (1964).
 October 13 — Rollie Seltz, 98, American NBA player (Anderson Packers).
 October 14 — Stanislav Kropilák, 67, Slovak FIBA Hall of Fame player (Inter Bratislava, BK Pardubice, CEP Fleurus).
 October 21 — Jim Bolla, 70, American college coach (UNLV, Hawaii).
 October 24 — Anatoly Zourpenko, 46, Greek-Russian player (Olympiacos, Papagou, Panellinios).
 November 2 — Ron Watts, 79, American NBA player (Boston Celtics).
 November 6 — Pilar Valero, 52, Spanish player (Ros Casares Godella, national team).
 November 9 — Fred Hickman, 66, American NBA broadcaster and studio host.
 November 15 — Gulam Abbas Moontasir, 80, Indian player (Bombay University, national team).
 November 16 — Mike Macaluso, 71, American NBA player (Buffalo Braves).
 November 16 — Les Wothke, 83, American college coach (Winona State, Western Michigan, Army)
 November 22 — John Y. Brown Jr., 88, American ABA (Kentucky Colonels) and NBA (Buffalo Braves, Boston Celtics) owner.
 November 26 — Charles Wolf, 96, American NBA coach (Cincinnati Royals, Detroit Pistons).
 November 27 — Murray Waxman, 97, Canadian Olympic player (1948).
 November 29 — Jeff Moore, 56, American college player (Auburn).
 December 3 — Alzhan Zharmukhamedov, 78, Kazakh player (CSKA Moscow, Soviet Union national team) and coach, Olympic gold medalist (1972).
 December 10 — Paul Silas, 79, American NBA player (St. Louis Hawks, Phoenix Suns, Boston Celtics, Denver Nuggets, Seattle SuperSonics) and coach (San Diego Clippers, Charlotte Hornets, New Orleans Hornets, Cleveland Cavaliers).
 December 11 — Ed Goorjian, 96, American college coach (Loyola Marymount).
 December 14 — Billie Moore, 79, American Hall of Fame college basketball coach (Cal State Fullerton, UCLA), Olympic silver medalist (1976).
 December 15 — Louis Orr, 64, American NBA player (Indiana Pacers, New York Knicks) and college coach (Siena, Seton Hall, Bowling Green).
 December 19 — Encarna Hernández, 105, Spanish player and coach.
 December 19 — Al Smith, 75, American ABA player (Denver Rockets, Utah Stars).
 December 23 — Willie Sims, 64, American-Israeli player (Hapoel Tel Aviv, Elitzur Netanya, Maccabi Tel Aviv).
 December 24 — Kenton Edelin, 60, American NBA player (Indiana Pacers).
 December 24 — Andrzej Pstrokoński, 86, Polish Olympic player (1960, 1964).
 December 25 — Ken Sidwell, 86, American college coach (Tennessee Tech).
 December 27 — Arnie Ferrin, 97, American BAA and NBA player (Minneapolis Lakers) and college All-American (Utah).

See also

References

2022 in basketball
2022 sport-related lists